Marco Christ (born 6 November 1980) is a German former professional football who played as a midfielder.

References

External links
 

1980 births
Living people
Footballers from Nuremberg
Association football midfielders
German footballers
Germany under-21 international footballers
Germany youth international footballers
1. FC Nürnberg players
1. FC Nürnberg II players
SSV Jahn Regensburg players
Dynamo Dresden players
VfR Aalen players
Fortuna Düsseldorf players
SV Wehen Wiesbaden players
2. Bundesliga players
3. Liga players